John Earl Manson (April 12, 1897 – May 31, 1976) was a Canadian professional ice hockey player. He played with the Seattle Metropolitans of the Pacific Coast Hockey Association.

References

1897 births
1976 deaths
Canadian ice hockey players
Ice hockey people from Ontario
People from Lanark County
Seattle Metropolitans players